Byron Dyce (born 27 March 1948) is a Jamaican former middle-distance runner who competed in the 1968 Summer Olympics and in the 1972 Summer Olympics.  He is still the current Jamaican National Record holder in the Mile and 1000 metres.  He still holds NYU records in the Indoor 800 metres and Indoor Mile.

The Millrose Games have named their annual collegiate Distance medley relay in his honor.  Dyce, who ran for NYU, is considered a legend among New York track and field circles.  After receiving his Ph.D. degree at the University of Florida, he is currently a mathematics professor at Santa Fe College in Gainesville, Florida.

References

1948 births
Living people
Jamaican male middle-distance runners
Olympic athletes of Jamaica
Athletes (track and field) at the 1968 Summer Olympics
Athletes (track and field) at the 1972 Summer Olympics
Pan American Games medalists in athletics (track and field)
Athletes (track and field) at the 1967 Pan American Games
Athletes (track and field) at the 1971 Pan American Games
Pan American Games bronze medalists for Jamaica
Athletes (track and field) at the 1970 British Commonwealth Games
Commonwealth Games competitors for Jamaica
Central American and Caribbean Games gold medalists for Jamaica
Competitors at the 1970 Central American and Caribbean Games
Central American and Caribbean Games medalists in athletics
Medalists at the 1971 Pan American Games
20th-century Jamaican people
21st-century Jamaican people